The Boundary (formerly named Waitakere Mega Centre) is an integrated bulk retail shopping centre located in Henderson, a suburb in the west of Auckland, New Zealand. The centre is configured in four freestanding blocks and draws from substantial undercroft parking facilities.

History and development
In 1994, Wellington-based Waltus Investments acquired the site, then known as Waitakere Plaza, which contained Kmart, Foodtown, four specialty stores and a food court. In April 1997, Waltus committed to a NZD $5.2 million expansion and refurbishment of the centre, with the intention of turning it into a niche bulk retailing centre. The development, funded by bank loans, was based on the needs of the two new anchor tenants, Briscoes and Rebel Sport, who had just signed nine-year leases. The work was completed in 1998.

In November 2004, Urbus Properties, an NZSX-listed property company formed from the Waltus syndicate in May 2001, commenced a $14.5 million refurbishment, and renamed the site Waitakere Mega Centre. The impetus came from the departure of anchor tenant Foodtown, who had complained that the centre could not compete with the adjacent Westfield WestCity (later rebranded as WestCity Waitakere). The redevelopment, which took place over 2005 and 2006, saw the centre modified to a U-shaped design with the shops facing onto car parking, in line with other centres at Mount Wellington and Albany. The original  Kmart store was demolished and replaced with 153 car parking bays, and Kmart moved into a  new-format premises. An additional  of retail space was added in the expansion. On 24 June 2005, ING acquired Urbus Properties, becoming New Zealand's second-largest listed property vehicle.

As at 31 January 2007, the centre was valued at $39,991,000 NZD. Waitakere Mega Centre was sold in 2014 for $45.75 million to a Christchurch-based investor. In 2017, it was rebranded as The Boundary.

Transport
The centre is accessible via the nearby Henderson railway station and by bus services from Britomart Transport Centre and New Lynn railway station.

See also
 List of shopping centres in New Zealand

References

Shopping centres in the Auckland Region
Henderson-Massey Local Board Area
West Auckland, New Zealand